Emil Forselius (23 November 1974 – 1 March 2010) was a Swedish actor. He graduated from the Swedish National Academy of Mime and Acting in 2002. He was awarded a Guldbagge Award for his role as Lasse in the film Tic Tac.

Personal life

Death 
Forselius was found dead in his Stockholm apartment in on 2 March 2010. He had left a farewell letter, and cause of death was determined to be suicide. Forselius had suffered from severe depression for some time.

Filmography
2010 – Wallander – Indrivaren
2007 – Himmelblå
2006 – Hombres
2003 – Deadline-Torp
2003 – Belinder auktioner
2002 – Stora teatern
2001 – Deadline
2000 – Naken
2000 – White Water Fury
1998 – Beck – Vita nätter
1998 – The Last Contract
1997 – Tic Tac

References

External links

Official website

1974 births
2010 deaths
People from Västervik Municipality
Best Supporting Actor Guldbagge Award winners
Male actors from Stockholm
Suicides in Sweden
2010 suicides